Cârlibaba is a commune located in Suceava County, Bukovina, northeastern Romania. It is composed of six villages, namely: Cârlibaba (Veche; also the commune seat), Cârlibaba Nouă, Iedu, Șesuri, Țibău, and Valea Stânei.

Other names 

In standard German (i.e. Hochdeutsch), Cârlibaba Veche is known as Mariensee whereas Cârlibaba Nouă is known as Ludwigsdorf.

Demographics 

At the 2002 census, 85.3% of inhabitants were Romanians, 9% Germans (more specifically Bukovina Germans and Zipser Germans), and 5.4% Ukrainians. 85.8% were Romanian Orthodox and 13.1% Roman Catholic.

At the 2011 census, 89.05% of inhabitants were Romanians, 5.07% Germans (more specifically Bukovina Germans and Zipser Germans) and 4.08 Ukrainians. For the rest of 1.81% inhabitants, their ethnicity was registered as unknown. 84.8% were Romanian Orthodox and 12.17% Roman Catholic. For the rest of 1.81 inhabitants, their religious confession was registered as unknown.

Late modern period history 

In the past, more specifically during the late Modern Age and, implicitly, during the Habsburg period as well as, respectively, the Austro-Hungarian period, the commune was inhabited by a more sizable German community composed by Zipser German mining colonists (part of the broader Bukovina German community of the Suceava County).

Administration and local politics

Communal council 

The commune's current local council has the following political composition, according to the results of the 2020 Romanian local elections:

Gallery

References 

Communes in Suceava County
Localities in Southern Bukovina
Mining communities in Romania